Yavor Ivanov (born 11 September 1991 in Sliven) is a Bulgarian football player, currently playing for Zagorets Nova Zagora as a defender.

Career
Ivanov is a product of Sliven's youth system. He made his debut during the 2009–10 season - on 25 March 2010 in a 0–1 away loss against Litex Lovech, coming on as a substitute for Aleksandar Tonev.

References

Living people
1991 births
Bulgarian footballers
Association football defenders
OFC Sliven 2000 players
First Professional Football League (Bulgaria) players
Sportspeople from Sliven